Kayode Maria Söderberg Shekoni  (born 17 April 1964) is a Swedish-Nigerian singer and actress.

Career 

Kayo started out as a singer in the 1980s with Swedish synth-pop band Freestyle. Kayo left the group with the release of the fourth single Vill ha dej. She then worked as a backup singer and dancer for various Swedish artists such as The Creeps, NASA and Anders Glenmark. She is a classically trained ballet dancer and performed professionally for many years. In 1990 she became part of the Nordik beat scene and released a self-titled club-soul influenced album on The SweMix Label. The music was mostly new jack swing but some tracks were reggae and house and featured hip hop influences. It was produced by label co-founder Stonebridge with Christian Falk and Alexander Bard (from Army of lovers). She released 4 hit singles of the album. Her second album was a Swedish language soul-pop album entitled ‘'Kärleksland'’ and featured songs by Orup and was well received by radio.

After acting in a couple of teenage movies in the mid-1990s, she became one-half of Le Click, who had several hit singles in North America and Germany during the 1990s. Later on, she became part of the pop group Afro-dite in the early 2000s, reaching the finals at Melodifestivalen 2002 with the song "Never Let It Go" and representing Sweden in the Eurovision song contest in Tallinn the same year. In 2003 Afro-dite competed once again at Melodifestivalen with the song "Aqua Playa".

In 2006, Kayo sang at Melodifestivalen as a solo artist and did not reach the finals. She has released some solo singles, such as "Another Mother" (#11 in Sweden) in 1991, and "(If It Makes You) Feel Good" in 2006. Kayo Shekoni has also hosted Förkväll on TV4 and Fångarna på fortet ( the latter with cross-country skiing star Gunde Svan).

She worked as a while as a skin therapist but never left showbiz assignments.

In spring 2010 she performed at the Melodifestivalen, not as a competitor, but performing a medley of past winning songs with several previous winners. In 2010 she co-hosted a four-episode series of pan-Scandinavian TV-show Inför Eurovision Song Contest 2010, analyzing all the competing songs submitted to that year's Eurovision Song Contest. She also works as a DJ, co-runs a night club and performs with disco & cocktail jazz band Cotton Club and Afro-Dite. 
She returned to Melodifestivalen with Afro-Dite in 2012.

She has been very active on the theatre stages with B.U.S. directed by Josette Bushell-Mingo, “Raisin in the Sun” with the National Theatre (and touring with the play in Sweden and Finland, and taking the production to South Africa and the US), Norrbottens Teatern's production of “Cabaret”, "The Witches of Eastwick" (the latter with West End star Peter Jöback), "Taube Today" at Västmanlands Teater and Uppsala Stadsteater.

She has also performed at Le Click reunion concerts.

In 2023, Shekoni is part of the main jury panel along with Swedish actor, performance artist, playwright and drag queen Robert Fux and radio and television host Farao Groth of the Swedish language reality television series Drag Race Sverige broadcast on SVT1 and SVT Play in Sweden and internationally on WOW Presents Plus.

Discography

Albums
Kayo (1990)
Kärleksland (1993)
Out There (featuring Kayo) (1996)
Le Click (featuring Kayo) (US and Germany only) (1997)
Never Let It Go (with Afro-dite) (2002)
Sisters in Crime 2016

Singles
Vill ha dej (with Freestyle) 1980
Time's on My Side (with The Supereffect) 1984
Hot Stuff (with Stanton Klub) 1988
Hon sa (with Anders Glenmark) 1990
Natural Experience (only released in the UK) 1990
Säg vad du vill/Tid för mig (with Jean-Paul Wall) 1990
Change of Attitude 1990
Another Mother 1990
Gimme Your Love 1991
Brother 1991
Do You Know (with Lab 5) 1991
Thing Called Love (with Natural Experience) 1992
Don't Leave Me (with Natural Experience) 1992
Om natten 1993
Sommar 1993
Kärleksland 1993
Torka dina tårar 1993
Om du vill ha mig som jag är 1993
Let It Begin – Peace in Mind (with Out There) 1996
These Honest Hands (with Out There) 1996
Call Me (with Le Click) 1997
Call Me-New Mixes (with Le Click) 1997
Don't Go (with Le Click) 1997
Voodoo Fever (with Le Click) 1997
Show Me (med Le Click) 1997
Tell Me That You Want Me (with Le Click) 1997
Something To Dream Of (with Le Click) 1997
If I Can't Have You (with LFO) 1998
Wannabe (Somebody Special) 1998
Never Let It Go (with Afro-Dite) 2002
Rivers of Joy/Shining Star (with Afro-Dite) 2002
I Love Clubbers (with Clubbers International) 2002
Turn It Up (with Afro-Dite) 2002
Aqua Playa (with Afro-Dite) 2003
In Your Life (with La Bouche) 2003
Innan natten är över 2006
(If It Makes You) Feel Good 2007
I Am What I Am (with Afro-Dite and Jonas Hedqvist) 2011
The Boy Can Dance (with Afro-Dite) 2012
You Got The Look (Foxy) 2012
Freeze 2016
Do You Love Me 2021
Never Let It Go 2022 (with Afro-Dite, remix by SoundFactory) 2022
We're Back (with Afro-Dite) 2022
Every Queen (with Robert Fux) 2023

References

External links 
 

1964 births
Eurodisco musicians
Swedish dance musicians
Swedish pop singers
Swedish expatriates in Germany
Swedish people of Nigerian descent
Living people
Place of birth missing (living people)
Swedish people of Yoruba descent
Yoruba actresses
Yoruba women musicians
Swedish actresses
English-language singers from Sweden
21st-century Nigerian actresses
Freestyle (Swedish band)
Drag Race Sverige
Melodifestivalen contestants of 2012
Melodifestivalen contestants of 2003
Melodifestivalen contestants of 2002